Janko Simović (born 7 June 1986) is a Montenegrin professional footballer who plays as a center back for Zeta.

Club career

Early career
Born in Mojkovac, SR Montenegro, SFR Yugoslavia, Simović learned his trade in OFK Igalo. He made his debut in senior-level football with Berane, after which he joined Metalac GM for a brief spell. He subsequently joined Mogren in 2008.

Mogren
In 2008, Simović joined Mogren. At the time of Simović's arrival, Mogren was an ambitious team with coach Branislav "Brano" Milačić and a number of players from the Montenegrin national team involving the likes of Radoslav Batak, Ivan Janjušević, Petar Grbić, Marko Ćetković, and Draško Božović.

Dynamo Kyiv
In late February 2012, Simović traveled to Israel to trial with Ukrainian team Dynamo Kyiv. During the trial, Simović played a friendly match for Dynamo against Maccabi Haifa, which Dynamo won 5–0. On 1 March 2012 he signed a three-year contract with Dynamo Kyiv. Dynamo Kyiv paid Mogren approximately €200,000 for Simović's transfer. After signing with Dynamo, he was loaned first to Arsenal Kyiv, and then loaned to Dynamo's B team. During his loans, Simović had a back injury, and after two years he terminated his contract with Dynamo.

Lovćen
After terminating his contract with Dynamo Kyiv, Simović joined Montenegrin team FK Lovćen in March 2014. In his first match with Lovćen, Simović scored a header against Budućnost only three minutes into the game. He was a starting player in Lovćen's squad which won the 2014 Montenegrin Cup.

Budućnost
After only a half season at Lovćen, Simović joined Budućnost in the summer of 2014 on a one-year contract. In August 2015, Budućnost and Simović agreed to renew the contract by one more year.

Mladost Podgorica
Simović signed a contract with Mladost Podgorica in late January 2018.

International career
After representing Montenegro at under-21 level, he made his debut for the senior team in a November 2008 friendly match against Macedonia. He came on as an injury time substitute for Elsad Zverotić and these remained his sole international minutes.

Honours
Mogren
Montenegrin First League: 2008–09, 2010–11

Lovćen
Montenegrin Cup: 2014

References

1986 births
Living people
People from Mojkovac
Association football central defenders
Serbia and Montenegro footballers
Montenegrin footballers
Montenegro under-21 international footballers
Montenegro international footballers
FK Berane players
FK Metalac Gornji Milanovac players
FK Mogren players
FC Dynamo Kyiv players
FC Arsenal Kyiv players
FK Lovćen players
FK Budućnost Podgorica players
Janko Simovic
OFK Titograd players
FK Rudar Pljevlja players
FK Dinamo Vranje players
FK Igalo 1929 players
OFK Grbalj players
FK Zeta players
Montenegrin First League players
Montenegrin Second League players
Serbian First League players
Janko Simovic
Montenegrin expatriate footballers
Expatriate footballers in Serbia
Montenegrin expatriate sportspeople in Serbia
Expatriate footballers in Ukraine
Montenegrin expatriate sportspeople in Ukraine
Expatriate footballers in Thailand
Montenegrin expatriate sportspeople in Thailand